Malcolm Grundy (born 1944) is an Anglican priest and theologian.

Education and career
Grundy first part trained as an architect before studying theology at King's College London.www.kcl.ac.uk/ His curacy from 1969-72 was at Doncaster Parish Church, now Doncaster Minster. From there he moved to the Sheffield Industrial Mission becoming Senior Chaplain in 1974. discovery.(nationalarchives.gov.uk) Whilst there he founded 'Workshop 6' a training workshop for unemployed young adults. In 1980, he moved to the Diocese of London to be Director of Education and Community. From 1986-91 he was Team Rector of Huntingdon in the Diocese of Ely. From there three years were spent as Director of the community development training agency AVEC.{www.avecresources.org/}

In 1994, Grundy was appointed Archdeacon of Craven in the Diocese of Bradford where he founded the Craven Trust, a fund to encourage local community projects. He was also part of the Trust's group which set up a fund raising £1.5M to aid farmers and local businesses affected by Foot and Mouth.(www.craventrust.org.uk) A long stay in this post without further Church of England preferment resulted in his being 'headhunted' in 2005 to become the founding director of the Foundation for Church Leadership, an organization dedicated to the training and support of senior church leaders.(www.westcott.cam.ac.uk) He was an Honorary Canon of Ely Cathedral from 1987-94.(elycathedral.anglican.org) In the staffing and financial crisis surrounding Bradford Cathedral, he was brought in as Acting Dean from 2004-5. He was appointed Non-Stipendiary Residentiary Canon and Acting Dean. On departure he was made Canon Emeritus.

Grundy achieved a PhD from Leeds University in 2014 for a study in the ways in which the Church of England oversees change. In this he was critical of the way in which the Yorkshire Dioceses Review was conducted. He continues to monitor the development of the newly established Diocese of Leeds.(www.leeds.anglican.org) He is a visiting fellow at York St John University (www.yorksj.ac.uk/).

Grundy is the author of a series of books on church leadership. Alongside stipendiary employment, he has been co-founder of church related organisations including The Edward King Institute for Ministry Development and founder editor of its journal Ministry, MODEM (Ministerial and Organizational Disciplines for the Advancement of Ministry) and the Foundation for Church Leadership. From 1996-2004 he was a Non-executive Director of the Church Times newspaper. He has also been Vice-Chair of the Retired Clergy Association of the Church of England and a trustee of The Women's Education Partnership, formerly Together for Sudan.{www.womenseducationpartnership.org/}and Chair of the York Anglo-Scandinavian Society.

Publications
 Light in the City: Stories of the Church Urban Fund Canterbury Press, 1990
 An Unholy Conspiracy : the separation of church and industry since the Reformation Canterbury Press, 1992
 Evangelisation through the Adult Catechumenate Grove 1991 (translated into Swedish as Om Vuxansvag In I Forsamlingen Verbum, 1992)
 Community Work: a handbook for volunteer groups and local churches Cassell Mowbray, 1995
 The Parchmore Partnership (Ed.) Chester House Publications, 1995
 Understanding Congregations: A new shape for the local church Cassell Mowbray, 1998
 Contributor and Editorial Advisor: Management and Ministry 1997 and Managing, Leading, Ministering March, 1999, Canterbury Press
 Faith On the Way Malcolm Grundy & Peter Ball, Cassell Mowbray, November 2000
 What they don’t teach you at theological college Canterbury Press, 2003
 Contributor to Creative Church Leadership MODEM/ Canterbury Press, February 2004
 What’s new in Church Leadership Canterbury Press, 2007
 Contributor to Breaking the Mould of Christendom, a symposium Epworth Press, 2008
 Leadership and Oversight: new models for episcopal ministry Continuum, 2011
 Multi-Congregation Ministry: theology and practice in a changing church Canterbury Press Norwich, 2015
 Building a Relational Culture: Finding Fellowship in the Church of England  Relational Church UK, 2022

References

External links
 Malcolm Grundy - Bloomsbury Publishing
 Published works by Canterbury Press

Alumni of King's College London
Alumni of the University of Leeds
1944 births
Living people
20th-century English Anglican priests
Archdeacons in the Diocese of Bradford